Wendy Elizabeth Davies  (born 1942) is an emeritus professor of history at University College London, England. Her research focuses on rural societies in early medieval Europe, focusing on the regions of Wales, Brittany and Iberia.

Career 
Davies studied for her BA degree (1964) and PhD degree (1970) in history at UCL. Following positions in Munich and Birmingham University (1970–76), she returned to UCL as a lecturer in medieval history in 1977. 

She became a professor in 1985 and thereafter became head of the department of history, then dean of the Faculty of Arts, dean of the Faculty of Social & Historical Sciences and, from 1995, UCL Pro-Provost (European Affairs). She was made a fellow of UCL in 1997.  She is also a founding fellow of the Learned Society of Wales.

Research 
Her teaching originally covered a wide area of European and English medieval history it more recently concentrated on Celtic subjects working across and within the disciplines of history, archaeology and Celtic studies.

She is particularly well known for her studies of early Welsh and Breton history. She is co-director, with Prof. James Graham-Campbell, of the interdisciplinary 'Celtic Inscribed Stones Project', established to build a database of all known early medieval Celtic inscribed stones. For the last twenty years she has also convened a major research group, known as the 'Bucknell Group', with the aim of examining the social significance of early medieval European charters. She is notable for her analysis of the Llandaff Charters.

She has a special interest in the economic and social structure of Western European pre-industrial rural communities and the ways in which they used land and for fifteen years ran, with Dr Grenville Astill, the "East Brittany Survey", a multidisciplinary research programme into settlement and land-use changes. Much of her work has involved collaboration with others and she believes in the importance of fieldwork in teaching and research. Her responsibility for co-ordinating and developing the college's European strategy required her to represent the provost and president both abroad and at home and to advise him on major European higher education trends, maintain the college's membership of European networks and work with to promote the good reputation of UCL. She is particularly concerned that academic qualifications be speedily recognised within Europe.

Awards and honours 
In 1988, Davies was elected as a Fellow of the Society of Antiquaries. She was elected as a Fellow of the British Academy in 1992. In 2001 she was a distinguished visiting professor at Berkeley. She served as a member of council from 2002 to 2003 and vice-president of the British Academy from 2003 to 2005. UCL marked her retirement at a reception on 30 October 2007. She was appointed Officer of the Order of the British Empire (OBE) in the 2008 Birthday Honours.

Publications

  
 An Early Welsh Microcosm: Studies in the Llandaff Charters (1978)
 The Llandaff Charters (1979)
 Wales in the Early Middle Ages (1982)
 The Settlement of Disputes in Early Medieval Europe (edited, with Paul Fouracre, 1986)
 Small worlds: the Village Community in Early Medieval Brittany (1988)
 Patterns of Power in Early Wales (1990)
 A Breton Landscape (with Grenville Astill, 1997)
 From the Vikings to the Norman's (2003)
 Acts of Giving: Individual, Community, and Church in Tenth-Century Christian Spain (2007)
 Welsh History in the Early Middle Ages (2009)
Windows on Justice in Northern Iberia, 800-1000 (2016)

Footnotes

Living people
Academics of University College London
Academics of the University of Birmingham
British women historians
Fellows of the British Academy
Fellows of the Royal Historical Society
Fellows of the Society of Antiquaries of London
Fellows of the Learned Society of Wales
Officers of the Order of the British Empire
People associated with the History Department, University College London
People associated with the UCL Institute of Archaeology
Place of birth missing (living people)
20th-century Welsh historians
Corresponding Fellows of the Medieval Academy of America
1942 births
21st-century Welsh historians